was a town located in Chichibu District, Saitama Prefecture, Japan.

As of 2003, the town had an estimated population of 5,728 and a population density of 86.66 persons per km2. The total area was 66.10 km2.

On April 1, 2005, Yoshida, along with the villages of Arakawa and Ōtaki (all from Chichibu District), was merged into the expanded city of Chichibu and no longer exists as an independent municipality.

External links
 Chichibu official website 

Dissolved municipalities of Saitama Prefecture
Chichibu District, Saitama
Chichibu, Saitama